Tomtar på loftet was the 1977 edition of Sveriges Radio's Christmas Calendar.

Plot
7 years old Lisa gets tired of her mother's cleaning for Christmas. She goes to the attic, discovering various exciting things.

References
 

1977 radio programme debuts
1977 radio programme endings
Sveriges Radio's Christmas Calendar